Through A Glass Darkly is a 1978 album by Peter Howell and the BBC Radiophonic Workshop. It featured six original instrumental compositions including "Through A Glass Darkly - A Lyrical Adventure", a 19-minute track which took up the whole of the first side of the record. Much of the music on the album leaned far more towards the prog rock of the 1970s than the previous output by the Radiophonic Workshop. The track "The Astronauts" later featured as the B-side to the 1980 single release of Howell's arrangement of the Doctor Who theme.

It was reissued as part of the Record Store Day exclusive 6-CD box set Four Albums 1968 - 1978 29 August 2020.

Track listing

Musicians
Peter Howell – piano, synthesisers, acoustic guitar
Terence Emery - timpani
Howard Tibble - drums
Brian Hussey - drums
Tony Catchpole - electric guitar
Des McCamley - bass guitar

References

External links
mb21 Discography entry

1978 albums
BBC Radiophonic Workshop albums
BBC Records albums